St. Paul Baptist Church—Morehead School in Kinder, Louisiana is a historic church which doubled as a public school for African-American students.  The church was built c. 1910.  It was used as a public school from 1919 to c. 1945.

It is a simple wood-frame church with a hipped roof and a forward-projecting tower.  Inside, it has a vaulted ceiling and a historic blackboard on its front wall.

The church was added to the National Register of Historic Places in 2005.

References

See also
 National Register of Historic Places listings in Allen Parish, Louisiana

Baptist churches in Louisiana
Private schools in Louisiana
Churches on the National Register of Historic Places in Louisiana
Churches completed in 1919
Churches in Allen Parish, Louisiana
School buildings on the National Register of Historic Places in Louisiana
National Register of Historic Places in Allen Parish, Louisiana